16560 Daitor  is a large Jupiter trojan from the Trojan camp, approximately  in diameter. It was discovered on 2 November 1991, by Belgian astronomer Eric Elst at the La Silla site of the European Southern Observatory in Chile. The carbonaceous C-type asteroid is one of the largest Jupiter trojans with an unknown rotation period. It was named after the Trojan warrior Daitor from Greek mythology.

Orbit and classification 

Daitor is a Jovian asteroid in the so-called Trojan camp, located in the  Lagrangian point, 60° behind Jupiter, orbiting in a 1:1 resonance with the Gas Giant .

It is also a non-family asteroid of the Jovian background population. It orbits the Sun at a distance of 4.9–5.3 AU once every 11 years and 4 months (4,152 days; semi-major axis of 5.06 AU). Its orbit has an eccentricity of 0.04 and an inclination of 15° with respect to the ecliptic. The body's observation arc begins with a precovery published by the Digitized Sky Survey and taken at Palomar Observatory in October 1955, more than 36 years prior to its official discovery observation at La Silla.

Naming 

This minor planet was named from Greek mythology after the Trojan warrior Daitor (Dai'tor), who was killed by Teucer (Teukros) during the Trojan War. The official naming citation was published by the Minor Planet Center on 27 May 2010.

Physical characteristics 

In the SDSS-based taxonomy, Daitor is a carbonaceous C-type, while most Jupiter trojans are D-type asteroids.

Rotation period 

As of 2018, no rotational lightcurve of Daitor has been obtained from photometric observations. The body's rotation period, pole and shape remain unknown.

Diameter and albedo 

According to the survey carried out by the Japanese Akari satellite, the NEOWISE mission of NASA's Wide-field Infrared Survey Explorer, and the Infrared Astronomical Satellite IRAS, Daitor measures between 43.38 and 51.42 kilometers in diameter and its surface has an albedo between 0.029 and 0.053. The Collaborative Asteroid Lightcurve Link assumes a standard albedo for a carbonaceous asteroid of 0.057 and calculates a diameter of 40.33 kilometers based on an absolute magnitude of 10.7.

References

External links 
 Asteroid Lightcurve Database (LCDB), query form (info )
 Dictionary of Minor Planet Names, Google books
 Discovery Circumstances: Numbered Minor Planets (15001)-(20000) – Minor Planet Center
 
 

016560
Discoveries by Eric Walter Elst
Named minor planets
19911102